Charlie David Kirk (born 24 December 1997) is an English professional footballer who plays as a winger for Burton Albion on loan from League One side Charlton Athletic.

Playing career

Crewe Alexandra
Kirk came through the Crewe Alexandra Academy, earning a call-up to the senior team whilst still a second year scholar. He made his debut in the Football League on 16 February 2016, in a 2–2 draw with Rochdale at Spotland, coming on as an 88th-minute substitute for Callum Saunders. He scored his first Crewe goal on 26 December 2017, the second in a 2–0 win at Chesterfield.

In May 2018, after making 69 appearances and scoring five goals, Kirk signed a new three-year-deal with Crewe through to summer 2021. The following season, he scored 11 goals in 45 first-team appearances.

After helping Crewe win promotion to League One in 2020, scoring nine goals and providing more assists than any other League Two player, Kirk signed a new two-year deal with the club through to June 2022. In September 2020, Kirk (along with Crewe team-mate Perry Ng) was named in the PFA League Two Team of the Year for the 2019–20 season.

Charlton Athletic
On 12 August 2021, Kirk was announced to have joined fellow League One side Charlton Athletic for an undisclosed fee on a four-year deal; Charlton had triggered a £500,000 release clause in his Crewe contract; Kirk later said: "I didn't just want to leave and for them [Crewe] not to get anything for me." He made his Charlton debut in the club's 2–1 defeat at Milton Keynes Dons on 17 August and two games later played in the club's first win of the season, 2–0 against former club Crewe Alexandra, on 28 August 2021.

Blackpool (loan)
On 27 January 2022, Kirk joined Blackpool on loan for the rest of the 2021–22 season with a view to a permanent transfer. He made his Blackpool debut on 5 February 2022, coming on as a second half substitute for CJ Hamilton in a 3–1 victory over Bristol City at Bloomfield Road.

Return to Charlton
Playing in all of Charlton's opening games of the 2022–23 season, Kirk scored his first Charlton goal in the fifth match, a 5–1 League One defeat of Plymouth Argyle at The Valley on 16 August 2022. He later scored twice in Charlton's 3–3 League One draw at Burton Albion on 12 November 2022.

Burton Albion (loan)
On 31 January 2023, Kirk joined Burton Albion on loan for the rest of the 2022–23 season, and made his debut as an 82nd minute substitute and scored the 96th minute winner in Burton's 3–2 win at Fleetwood Town on 4 February 2023.

Career statistics

Honours
Individual
PFA Team of the Year: 2019–20 League Two

References

External links

1997 births
Living people
People from Winsford
English footballers
Association football forwards
Crewe Alexandra F.C. players
Charlton Athletic F.C. players
Blackpool F.C. players
Burton Albion F.C. players
English Football League players